The National Association of Professors of Hebrew (NAPH) is a professional organization for university professors of the Hebrew language in the United States. It was established in 1950.

The association publishes the journals Hebrew Studies and Hebrew Higher Education.

References

External links

Hebrew language
Professional associations based in the United States
Organizations established in 1950
1950 establishments in the United States